Loats Female Orphan Asylum of Frederick City is a historic home and former orphanage building located at Frederick, Frederick County, Maryland.

It is an imposing -story Federal Flemish bond brick mansion with a sloping gable roof.  The small addition on the east end of the house served as an office for the original owner, John Baltzell, M.D. (1774–1854).  The house's third owner, John Loats (first president of the Frederick and Pennsylvania Line railroad, headquartered in Frederick.), established in his will of 1879, the Loats Female Orphan Asylum of Frederick City.  It currently serves as headquarters to the Historical Society of Frederick County.

It was listed on the National Register of Historic Places in 1972.

References

External links

, including photo from 1997, at Maryland Historical Trust
Loat's Female Orphan Home, 24 East Church Street, Frederick, Frederick, MD at the Historic American Buildings Survey (HABS)

Houses in Frederick County, Maryland
Houses on the National Register of Historic Places in Maryland
Houses completed in 1824
Historic American Buildings Survey in Maryland
National Register of Historic Places in Frederick County, Maryland